"Vic Acid" is a single by the electronic artist Squarepusher, released on April 1, 1997 on Warp Records.

Style
The song "Vic Acid" is a drum & bass track. The track "Lone Raver" is a jungle track that has been compared to music by Caustic Window, better known as Aphex Twin.

Release
"Vic Acid" was released by Warp Records on April 1, 1997. It was released on 12-inch vinyl, compact disc and digital download.

Reception
The online music database AllMusic gave the single two stars out of five, stating that it "doesn't appear that much thought went into the arrangements on Vic Acid, as the B-sides can't sustain a listener's interest." and that "it's a rather pale companion to its full-length parent Hard Normal Daddy."

Track listing
All songs by Tom Jenkinson.
 "Vic Acid (Hard and Normal Mix)" – 3:06
 "Lone Raver (Live in Chelmsford Mix)" – 5:00
 "Fat Controller (G7000 Remix)" – 4:08
 "The Barn (303 Kebab Mix)" – 2:11

Notes

External links

Squarepusher songs
1997 debut singles
1997 songs
Warp (record label) singles